The Abilene Christian Wildcats softball team represents Abilene Christian University, located in Abilene, Texas. The Wildcats are a member of the Western Athletic Conference and participate in Division I college softball. The team is currently led by head coach Abigail Farler and plays home games at Poly Wells Field. In its inaugural 1997 season, the Wildcats finished with a remarkable #4 South Central Regional ranking and a #12 NCAA II ranking in March 1998.

Year-by-year results
Source:

References

External links
Website